is a Japanese media personality and former AV idol.

Early life and career

Early life 
Shibuya was born in Tokyo in 1991 to a prominent Japanese doctor, and grew up watching Japanese anime and manga.After graduating from high school, Shibuya studied English in Aoyama Gakuin University.  As a young adult, Shibuya became a baseball reporter for the daily newspaper Tokyo Sports, covering Nippon Professional Baseball's Pacific League from 2012 to 2014. In September 2014, Shibuya passed the TOEIC with a score of 990 points. In 2016 she received qualifications in teaching English and in childcare. 

In May 2021, Shibuya revealed that at the age of 11, she was sexually abused by her elder brother, but her parents initially called her a liar when she confronted them over the incident. Her porn career severely strained her relationship with her parents, who wanted to keep their reputation as model citizens.

Adult video career

Shibuya had a part-time job reviewing adult products, which eventually led her to debut in her first adult video in November 2014 through an exclusive deal with Alice Japan. Throughout her career, she has released more than 750 films.

From May 2015 to April 2016, Shibuya joined the Japanese AV idol group  as its ninth member, and also recorded a single in August 2015. From April 2017 to November 2019, Shibuya hosted Kaho Shibuya’s Tawawa Challenge on Japan's Skyperfect TV.

Shibuya announced her retirement from the AV industry at an event held in Tokyo in May 2018.

Later career

Since leaving the AV industry, Shibuya has moved on to a number of projects in the entertainment field.

 Cosplay: Shibuya has since taken her love of anime and manga professionally, appearing as a cosplay guest at anime conventions internationally. She has also published two photo books of herself in various anime costumes.

 Acting: After having made her mainstream acting debut in the Japanese film  in September 2019, Shibuya is currently lined up to be a voice actress in an upcoming untitled anime, which has been delayed by the COVID-19 pandemic.

 Hosting: Since August 2019, Shibuya been the host of the radio show Kaho Shibuya’s TOKUMORI.  She has also hosted her own YouTube channel “Omochan” beginning in November 2018. In June 2020, she launched her Twitch channel.

 Writing: In July 2019, Shibuya wrote a memoir about her life in the AV industry which she says she hopes to be able to translate into English. It was published in 2020.

Works

Books

Discography 
Singles
 Natsu no Ojosan (2015)

References

External links

1991 births
Living people
Japanese sports journalists
21st-century Japanese actresses
Japanese pornographic film actresses
Actresses from Tokyo
Cosplayers
Twitch_(service)_streamers
Japanese women radio presenters
Japanese radio presenters
Japanese voice actresses
21st-century Japanese women writers
Japanese memoirists
Women memoirists
Japanese women journalists
21st-century memoirists
Japanese YouTubers
YouTube channels launched in 2018